Nanocassiope oblonga is a species of crab within the family Xanthidae. It lives in the Eastern Central Pacific off the coasts of the French Polynesia islands near Nuku Hiva and Eiao, in benthic environments at depths of 140 to 155 meters.

References 

Crustaceans described in 1995
Xanthoidea
Fauna of French Polynesia
Crustaceans of the Pacific Ocean